Megachile turbulenta is an invalid species of bee in the family Megachilidae. M. turbulent was described by Mitchell in 1930. Megachile turbulenta has no common name.

References

Turbulenta
Insects described in 1930